Atlantic is a community in the Canadian province of Nova Scotia, located in the Shelburne municipal district of Shelburne County.

See also
 List of communities in Nova Scotia

References

Communities in Shelburne County, Nova Scotia
Populated coastal places in Canada